The 1915 South Carolina 4th congressional district special election was held on September 14, 1915, to select a Representative for the 4th congressional district to serve out the remainder of the term for the 64th Congress.  The special election resulted from the resignation of Representative Joseph T. Johnson on April 19, 1915.  Samuel J. Nicholls, a former state Representative from Spartanburg, won the Democratic primary and was unopposed in the general election.

Democratic primary
The South Carolina Democratic Party held their primary in the summer of 1915.  Six candidates entered the race and among those who sought the seat was future Governor of South Carolina, Ibra Charles Blackwood.  Samuel J. Nicholls emerged atop the first primary election on August 10 and won the runoff election against B.A. Morgan on August 24.  There was no opposition to the Democratic candidate in the general election so Nicholls was elected to serve out the remainder of the term.

General election results

|-
| 
| colspan=5 |Democratic hold
|-

See also
South Carolina's 4th congressional district
List of special elections to the United States House of Representatives in South Carolina

References

"Report of the Secretary of State to the General Assembly of South Carolina.  Part II." Reports and Resolutions of the General Assembly of the State of South Carolina. Volume III. Columbia, SC: 1916.

South Carolina 1915 04
South Carolina 1915 04
1915 04
South Carolina 04
United States House of Representatives 04
United States House of Representatives 1915 04
Single-candidate elections